Irah Chase (born at Stratton, Vermont, October 5, 1793; died at Newtonville, Massachusetts, November 1, 1864) was a United States Baptist clergyman.

Biography
He was educated at Middlebury College and Andover Theological Seminary, and was ordained in 1817. After laboring as a Baptist missionary in the western part of Virginia, he became in 1818 professor in a new theological school at Philadelphia, which was soon after transferred to Washington, D.C., to become the theological department of the newly chartered Columbian College. In this office he remained seven years, one of which he spent in Europe, and in 1825 he was prominent in establishing the Newton Theological Institution at Newton Centre, Massachusetts, with which he was connected as professor until 1845, when he resigned, in order to devote himself to theological and literary studies. During a visit to Europe in 1830 he aided in founding the Baptist mission in France.

Works
 The Life of John Bunyan
 The Design of Baptism
 The Work claiming to be the Constitution of the Holy Apostles, revised from the Greek
 Infant Baptism an Invention of Man
He wrote many sermons, essays, and contributions to reviews on questions of church history and doctrine.

Family
He married Harriet 
Savage in 1821.  They had seven children, five of whom survived infancy.  She died in 1834, and in 1835 he married Martha Raymond, with whom he had two children, one of whom survived infancy.  Martha died in 1846.

Notes

References

Further reading
 Hague, William. Christian Greatness in the Scholar: A Discourse on the Life and Character of Rev. Irah Chase. (Boston: Gould and Lincoln, 1866).
 

1793 births
1864 deaths
People from Newton, Massachusetts
Middlebury College alumni
American biblical scholars
George Washington University faculty
19th-century Baptist ministers from the United States